Abdulkadir Parmak (born 28 December 1994) is a Turkish professional footballer who plays as a midfielder for Süper Lig club Gaziantep on loan from Trabzonspor.

Professional career
Parmak is a youth product of Trabzonspor, and spent his early career with their reserve team 1461 Trabzon before moving to Ümraniyespor on loan. He returned to Trabzonspor in 2016, and went on loan with Altınordu and Adana Demirspor before returning to their first team. He made his professional debut with Trabzonspor in a 2–0 loss to İstanbul Başakşehir on 12 August 2018.

On 27 July 2022, Parmak joined Gaziantep on a season-long loan.

International
He made his Turkey national team debut on 10 September 2019 in a Euro 2020 qualifier against Moldova. He replaced Dorukhan Toköz in the 87th minute.

Honours
Trabzonspor
Turkish Cup: 2019–20
Turkish Super Cup (1): 2020

References

External links
 
 
 
 

1994 births
Living people
Sportspeople from Trabzon
Turkish footballers
Turkey international footballers
Ümraniyespor footballers
Trabzonspor footballers
Adana Demirspor footballers
Kayserispor footballers
Gaziantep F.K. footballers
Süper Lig players
TFF First League players
TFF Second League players
Association football midfielders